Peter Felix Ganz (3 November 1920 – 17 August 2006) was a German-born Germanist who emigrated to Britain in 1938, translated conversations of German nuclear scientists during Operation Epsilon in 1945, and became a professor at the University of Oxford.

Early life and education
Peter Ganz was the son of Dr. Hermann Friedrich Ignaz Ganz and Dr. Charlotte (Lotte), née Fromberg. His younger brother, then Ludwig Hermann Ganz, was the historian of Africa Lewis H Gann. Ganz attended the  but was forced to leave it since his family was classed as Jewish. In November 1938, he was held for six weeks in the concentration camp at Buchenwald but was then able to emigrate to England. After internment on the Isle of Man, he joined the Royal Pioneer Corps, then worked for the Combined Services Detailed Interrogation Centre (CSDIC) with Fritz Lustig.

Career
At the end of the war he worked at Farm Hall listening to the reactions of captured nuclear scientists including Heisenberg, Otto Hahn and others after the atomic bomb was dropped on Hiroshima.

From 1948 to 1949 Ganz worked as assistant lecturer at Royal Holloway College, London and from 1949–60 as Lecturer in German Philology and Medieval Literature at Westfield College, London.
From 1963 to 1972 he was a Fellow at Hertford College, Oxford, Professor of Medieval German Language and Literature and Fellow of St Edmund Hall, Oxford from 1972 to 1985 where his successor (until 2012) was Nigel F Palmer.

He was a Resident Fellow at the Herzog August Library, Wolfenbüttel from 1985 to 1988.

Personal life

In 1949, he married Rosemary Allen (died 1986). They had two sons: Adam Ganz (a writer who also wrote a play on his father's experiences at Farm Hall) and David Ganz (until 2010 Professor of Paleography at King's College London), and two daughters: Deborah Ganz and Rachel Ganz. 
After Rosemary Allen's death, he married Nicolette Mout (Professor of Modern History at Leiden) in 1987.

Orders and awards
He was also an Honorary Professor at the University of Göttingen.

Selected publications
 Der Einfluss des Englischen auf den deutschen Wortschatz (1957)
 Gottfried von Strassburg's Tristan (1978)
 editor: Dukus Horant
 editor: Burckhardt's lectures Über das Studium der Geschichte (1982, also as volume 10 of the Kritische Gesamtausgabe, 2000)

References

External links
 Oxford Dictionary of National Biography
Celebration of his 100th birthday at the University of Oxford

1920 births
2006 deaths
Academics of the University of Oxford
Commanders Crosses of the Order of Merit of the Federal Republic of Germany
Fellows of St Edmund Hall, Oxford
Germanists
People interned in the Isle of Man during World War II
British Army personnel of World War II
Royal Pioneer Corps soldiers
German emigrants to the United Kingdom